The ulnar canal or ulnar tunnel (also known as Guyon's canal or tunnel) is a semi-rigid longitudinal canal in the wrist that allows passage of the ulnar artery and ulnar nerve into the hand.  The roof of the canal is made up of the superficial palmar carpal ligament, while the deeper flexor retinaculum and hypothenar muscles comprise the floor.  The space is medially bounded by the pisiform and pisohamate ligament more proximally, and laterally bounded by the hook of the hamate more distally. It is approximately 4 cm long, beginning proximally at the transverse carpal ligament and ending at the aponeurotic arch of the hypothenar muscles.

Eponym
The ulnar tunnel is eponymously named after the French surgeon Jean Casimir Félix Guyon, who originally described the canal in 1861.

Clinical significance
Entrapment of the ulnar nerve at the ulnar canal can result in symptoms of ulnar neuropathy, including numbness or weakness of certain parts of the hand. (See full article on ulnar nerve entrapment.) This is known as ulnar nerve entrapment or Guyon's canal syndrome. There are four subtypes of ulnar neuropathy at the wrist, of which type II is the most common. Guyon's canal syndrome  may be secondary to ganglion cyst formation, or compression against a bicycle handlebar.

See also 
 Carpal tunnel

References

Wrist